Ellikon an der Thur is a municipality in the district of Winterthur in the canton of Zürich in Switzerland.

History

Ellikon an der Thur is first mentioned in 1257 as Ellinkon.

Geography
Of this area, 69.7% is used for agricultural purposes, while 19.4% is forested. Of the rest of the land, 10.4% is settled (buildings or roads) and the remainder (0.6%) is non-productive (rivers, glaciers or mountains).   housing and buildings made up 5.9% of the total area, while transportation infrastructure made up the rest (4.3%). Of the total unproductive area, water (streams and lakes) made up 0.4% of the area.   6.7% of the total municipal area was undergoing some type of construction.

Demographics
, 8.4% of the population was made up of foreign nationals.   the gender distribution of the population was 50.6% male and 49.4% female. Over the last 10 years the population has grown at a rate of 13.9%. Most of the population speaks German  (93.3%), with Serbo-Croatian being second most common ( 3.2%) and Albanian being third ( 0.7%).

In the 2007 election the most popular party was the SVP which received 53.1% of the vote.  The next three most popular parties were the SPS (10.8%), the CSP (10.4%) and the FDP (8.4%).

The age distribution of the population is children and teenagers (0–19 years old) make up 29.9% of the population, while adults (20–64 years old) make up 58.6% and seniors (over 64 years old) make up 11.5%.  The entire Swiss population is generally well educated.  In Ellikon an der Thur about 83.2% of the population (between age 25-64) have completed either non-mandatory upper secondary education or additional higher education (either university or a Fachhochschule).  There are 286 households in Ellikon an der Thur.

Ellikon an der Thur has an unemployment rate of 0.87%.  , there were 185 people employed in the primary economic sector and about 21 businesses involved in this sector.  113 people are employed in the secondary sector and there are 11 businesses in this sector.  132 people are employed in the tertiary sector, with 19 businesses in this sector.   39.3% of the working population were employed full-time, and 60.7% were employed part-time.

 there were 129 Catholics and 533 Protestants in Ellikon an der Thur. In the 2000 census, religion was broken down into several smaller categories. Of the rest of the population, 0% were Muslim, 5% belonged to another religion (not listed), 1.9% did not give a religion, and 8.4% were atheist or agnostic.

The historical population is given in the following table:

References

External links

 Official website 
 

Municipalities of the canton of Zürich